355 squadron or variation, may refer to:

 No. 355 Squadron RAF
355th Fighter Squadron, an inactive United States Air Force unit
355th Tactical Airlift Squadron, a U.S. Air Force squadron based at Rickenbacker Air National Guard Base
355th Troop Carrier Squadron, an inactive United States Air Force unit
355th Reconnaissance Aviation Squadron, a Cold War era unit of the Yugoslav Air Force

See also
 355 (disambiguation)